Félicien Henry Caignart de Saulcy (1832-1912) was  a  French entomologist specialising in Coleoptera. He was especially interested in the beetle fauna of caves. His collection of Scydmaenidae, Trechinae, Bathysciinae, Liodidae, Staphylinidae, Pselaphidae and Catopidae is in the Muséum national d'histoire naturelle, in Paris.  He died in Metz.

Works

Saulcy, F.H.C. (1876). Species des Paussides, Clavigérides, Psélaphides & Scydménides de l'Europe et des pays circonvoisins. Bull. Soc. Hist. Nat. Metz 14: 25-100

References

Constantin, R. 1992: Memorial des Coléopteristes Français. Bull. liaison Assoc. Col. reg. parisienne, Paris (Suppl. 14):1-92		
Fleur, A. 1924: Bull. Soc. Hist. nat. Moselle (4) 6(30)117-166, Portrait.	
Fleur, E. 1935: Bull. Cent. Soc. Hist. nat. Moselle (3) 10(34)60-61, Portrait.	
Kheil, N. M. 1911: Int. Ent. Z. 5 1911-12,243-245.	
Lhoste, J. 1987: Les entomologistes français. 1750 - 1950.  INRA (Institut National de la Recherche Agronomique), Paris, 1-355.

1832 births
1912 deaths
French entomologists